Fabienne Wohlwend (born 7 November 1997 in Vaduz) is a female racing driver from Liechtenstein who competes in the W Series.

Biography

Formula 4
Wohlwend entered car racing in 2016, having been successful in junior karting in Liechtenstein and Switzerland. She debuted in the Italian F4 Championship with Aragón Racing, before a mid-season switch to DR Formula. She failed to qualify for the final at the first round in Misano (the series ran a unique format for said round after 41 cars entered a circuit with a capacity of 36) and, after the qualifying race system was abandoned, did not score any points during the course of the season - her best finish being an 11th place in the final race of the season at Monza. Being the only woman competing in that championship, she won the Women's Trophy class uncontested.

Audi Sport TT Cup
She moved into sportscars for 2017, successfully applying for the Audi Sport TT Cup. Her best result of 8th came in her first race in the category at the Hockenheimring, and the Liechtensteiner finished the season 11th in the standings.

Ferrari Challenge
Wohlwend twinned her application to the Audi Sport TT Cup with a partial campaign in the Ferrari Challenge European Championship. Competing in the amateur-level Coppa Shell class, this campaign yielded more success; from her six races she would score two pole positions, four podiums and a race win at Imola – in the process becoming the first woman to win a race outright for the Ferrari marque. Wohlwend also competed in the Ferrari Challenge season-ending Finali Mondiali at Mugello, finishing 3rd in the Coppa Shell class having benefitted from a controversial pass on Manuela Gostner.

With the demise of the Audi TT Cup, Wohlwend remained in the Ferrari Challenge – however made the step up to the Pro-Am class of the Trofeo Pirelli division. In a season plagued with inconsistency, she won three of the fourteen races – one at the Circuit de Spa-Francorchamps and both races at the Misano World Circuit – and finished second in the championship to Briton Chris Froggatt. She returned to the Finali Mondiali event for 2018, and won the Pro-Am class of the Trofeo Pirelli race – becoming, on a technicality, the first female World Champion on four wheels.

For 2019, Wohlwend again competed in the Trofeo Pirelli division of Ferrari Challenge, this time as a Pro driver. This campaign consisted of the Valencia, Imola and Mugello events – with a best result of 4th in the World Final. She returned in 2020 for a planned full campaign, scoring pole position in the first race at Imola before suffering a fuel pump failure on the final lap. In a reduced field due to the coronavirus, she maintained consistent appearances on the podium but race wins proved elusive – and eventually missed three races in two events due to mechanical problems. She finally scored a win in the penultimate race of the season at Misano before following it up with a 2nd place in the Finali Mondiali – her third Finali podium in four attempts.

W Series

In 2019 she returned to open-wheel racing, having qualified for the W Series – a Formula 3 championship solely for women. Competing against mostly professional drivers for the first time, she finished 6th and 7th in the opening rounds at Hockenheim and Zolder, having qualified on the front row in the former. At the third round at Misano, she claimed the second-ever pole position for a Liechtensteiner in FIA-sanctioned open-wheel racing, a result which she converted into a podium finish. She finished fourth ahead of a hard-charging Emma Kimiläinen at the Norisring, but ended the Assen race down in 15th after breaking her front wing whilst trying to pass Gosia Rdest. The final race at Brands Hatch resulted in a 5th-place finish on the tail of series champion Jamie Chadwick, but second place for Kimiläinen meant Wohlwend dropped to 6th in the standings.

She was scheduled to return to the championship in 2020 before it was cancelled in response to the COVID-19 pandemic.

She continued to compete in the W Series on its return in 2021 as a Formula One support series. In the opening race of the season in Austria, she finished third after starting from 9th position. In the third race of the season at Silverstone, she started on the front row and achieved her second podium finish of the season by crossing the line in second place, her highest race finish in the W Series so far, even though she was leading until a braking error allowed Alice Powell to overtake her. She scored no further podium finishes in the remaining five races and finished the season 6th in the standings.

Wohlwend returned to the championship in 2022 with the CortDAO entry. At the opening round in Miami she qualified 5th for both races despite crashing late in the session – in the first race she crashed into Abbie Eaton and she finished 11th in the second after a grid penalty for the incident with the Briton. After a ninth-place finish in Barcelona she finished 4th at Silverstone after passing Beitske Visser on the penultimate lap. She finished seventh at Circuit Paul Ricard after a spirited fight with team-mate Marta García and followed it up with sixth at the Hungaroring. The Liechtensteiner finished eighth in her first Asian race at the Marina Bay Street Circuit before the season was cut short due to financial issues; her worst W Series campaign ended with 32 points and 10th in the standings.

Endurance racing
Wohlwend made her endurance racing debut in the VLN Series in 2019, contesting VLN5 in the V4 class. She did not finish the race after an incident at Schwedenkreuz. She returned to the championship in 2021 in the VT2 category, with her first race cancelled due to snowfall and her second resulting in a 4th in class, followed up by a podium in NLS3. She was picked up by WS Racing to contest the 2021 Nürburgring 24 Hours Qualifying Race in their Audi R8 GT4 alongside Carrie Schreiner, Célia Martin and Laura Kraihammer – a last-minute replacement for Pippa Mann and Christina Nielsen who had failed to obtain the correct licences in time. A class win followed, impressing the outfit – and they retained the Liechtensteiner but moved her to their VT2-class BMW 328i for the 24 Hour race after Mann and Nielsen met their licence requirements, where she finished 9th in class after less than half of the race was run under green flags due to torrential rain and fog.

Wohlwend returned to the NLS in 2022 with WS Racing's "Girls Only" GT4 squad. After not starting the first race of the season due to a practice crash for her co-driver, she took part in NLS3 before finishing her first full Nürburgring 24 Hours in 35th overall.

Personal life
Wohlwend has been nominated for Liechtenstein Sportswoman of the Year four times; in 2018, 2019, 2021 and 2022.

During her early career, Wohlwend worked for the Vaduz branch of VP Bank in order to fund her racing.

Racing record

Career summary

* Season still in progress.

Ferrari Challenge Finali Mondiali results

Complete W Series results
(key) (Races in bold indicate pole position) (Races in italics indicate fastest lap)

* Season still in progress.

Complete 24 Hours of Nürburgring results

References

External links

 Profile at Driver Database

Liechtenstein racing drivers
Female racing drivers
Liechtenstein sportswomen
1997 births
Living people
Formula 4 drivers
W Series drivers